Browstat is a Microsoft utility for Windows that can monitor the browser service within a local area network (LAN). It can help diagnose a Microsoft network by listing machines and servers currently using the Browser Service, or by showing usage statistics.

The BROWSTAT.exe command-line tool is used to get a domain, browser, and PDC info.

External links
Browstat documentation on Microsoft.com

References

Microsoft software